Coeliastes is a genus of beetles belonging to the family Curculionidae.

The genus was first described by Weise in 1883.

The species of this genus are found in Europe.

Species:
 Coeliastes lamii (Fabricius, 1792)

References

Ceutorhynchini
Curculionidae genera